Nettenchelys inion is an eel in the family Nettastomatidae (duckbill/witch eels). It was described by David G. Smith and James Erwin Böhlke in 1981. It is a marine, deep water-dwelling eel which is known from a single specimen discovered in Florida, USA, in the western central Atlantic Ocean.

The species epithet "inion" means "back of head" in Greek, and is treated as a noun in apposition. It refers to the location of the posterior nostril.

References

Nettastomatidae
Fish described in 1981